The genus Arctocephalus consists of the southern fur seals. Arctocephalus translates to "bear head."

Taxonomy

The number of species within the genus has been questioned, primarily based on limited molecular data. The issue is complicated because some of the species are able to produce fertile hybrids. A recent review recommended the retention of seven species, deprecating the New Zealand fur seals to a subspecies of the South American fur seal, while also questioning the status of the Guadalupe fur seal. Other recent studies have indicated the genus may be paraphyletic, and some taxonomic reshuffling was previously done to account for this; however, more recent studies support it being monophyletic, with the alleged paraphyly being a consequence of incomplete lineage sorting.

Extant Species

References

 
Mammal genera
Taxa named by Frédéric Cuvier